Hermippe , or , is a natural satellite of Jupiter. It was discovered concurrently with Eurydome by a team of astronomers from the Institute for Astronomy of the University of Hawaii led by David Jewitt and Scott S. Sheppard and Jan Kleyna in 2001, and given the temporary designation .

Hermippe is about 4 kilometres in diameter, and orbits Jupiter at an average distance of 21,500,000 kilometers in about 630 days, at an inclination of 151° to the ecliptic (149° to Jupiter's equator), in a retrograde direction and with an eccentricity of 0.2290.

It was named in August 2003 by the IAU, after Hermippe, a lover of Zeus (Jupiter).

References

External links 
Jupiter's Known Satellites (by Scott S. Sheppard)
New Jupiter Satellite Movie Images (image)
 Astronomers Discover 11 More Small Moons of Jupiter (JPL, 2002) 

Ananke group
Irregular satellites
Moons of Jupiter
Discoveries by Scott S. Sheppard
Discoveries by David C. Jewitt
Discoveries by Jan Kleyna
20011209
Moons with a retrograde orbit